Richard Petherick (born 4 April 1986 in Hamilton) is a field hockey player from New Zealand. While at Hamilton Boys' High School Petherick played for regional and national representative teams. He earned his first cap for the national men's team, nicknamed The Black Sticks, in 2005 against Malaysia. He also gained selection for both the Sultan Azlan Shah tournament in May and for the European tour in July.

Petherick travelled as a reserve to the 2008 Summer Olympics but did not compete. He competed for New Zealand at the 2012 Summer Olympics.

International senior tournaments
 2005 – Sultan Azlan Shah Cup
 2006 – World Cup

Life now
Petherick now teaches PE at Overseas Family School in Singapore

References

External links
 
 Athlete profile

1986 births
Living people
New Zealand male field hockey players
Sportspeople from Hamilton, New Zealand
2006 Men's Hockey World Cup players
2010 Men's Hockey World Cup players
Field hockey players at the 2012 Summer Olympics
Olympic field hockey players of New Zealand
People educated at Hamilton Boys' High School